Bharathidasan Engineering College is a College of Engineering located in Vellore, Tamil Nadu, India.

Departments

Undergraduate 
 Civil Engineering
 Computer Science Engineering
 Electrical & Electronics Engineering
 Electronics & Communication Engineering
 Mechanical Engineering

Bachelors of Technology 
 Information Technology

Post Graduate 
 Applied Electronics
 Computer Science & Engineering
 Structural Engineering
 Thermal Engineering

External links 
 

Engineering colleges in Tamil Nadu
Universities and colleges in Vellore district